Irish Times is the third studio album by the Irish folk band Patrick Street, released in 1990 on Green Linnet and Special Delivery Records, a division of Topic Records.

Founding members Andy Irvine, Kevin Burke, Jackie Daly and Arty McGlynn were joined by Bill Whelan (keyboards), James Kelly (fiddle), Declan Masterson (uilleann pipes, low whistle, keyboards) and Gerry O'Beirne (vocals, guitar), who also contributed two songs. The album was produced by Gerry O'Beirne and Patrick Street, and recorded at Windmill Lane Studios, Dublin, Ireland.

Track listing
All tracks Traditional; arranged by Patrick Street; except where indicated
 "Music for a Found Harmonium" (Simon Jeffes, Penguin Café Ltd) – 2:38
 "Brackagh Hill" (words: Traditional; music: Andy Irvine) – 5:48
 "Brian O'Lynn"/"The Woods of Old Limerick" – 3:17 
 "Strokestown" (G. O'Beirne) – 4:45
 "The Newmarket Polkas" – 3:32
 "A Forgotten Hero" (Andy Irvine) – 6:02 
 "Doorus Hill" (J. Daly) / "The Rolling Reel/The Ballygrow Reel/Dennis Murphy's Reel" – 4:40
 "In the Land of the Patagarang" (G. O'Beirne) – 4:20
 "Boston O'Connor"/"John Gaffy's Fling"/"The Kerryman's Fling" – 3:40
 "The Humours of the King of Ballyhooley" – 4:08

Personnel
 Andy Irvine - vocals, mandolin, bouzouki, harmonica
 Kevin Burke - fiddle
 Jackie Daly - accordion
 Gerry O'Beirne - vocals, guitar
 James Kelly - fiddle
 Declan Masterson - uilleann pipes, low whistle, keyboards
 Arty McGlynn - guitar
 Bill Whelan - keyboards

References

External links
Irish Times at Allmusic website
Irish Times at MusicBrainz website
Irish Times at Discogs website
Patrick Street at Adastra website

1990 albums
Patrick Street albums